Three Miles North of Molkom is a 2008 documentary film directed by Corinna Villari-McFarlane and Robert Cannan. It was nominated in the Best British Documentary category for the British Independent Film Awards 2008.

It follows seven participants of the 2007 No Mind Festival at Ängsbacka, a course center located in Molkom, Sweden. This yearly New Age event lasts one or two weeks, has a thousand participants, and is claimed to be the largest alternative festival in Northern Europe.

The activities shown in the film include tree hugging (each one choosing his own tree), firewalking, nude swimming, sweat lodge, hugging, Tantric sex, singing, dancing, talks in "sharing circles". There is also an exercise in defending oneself against a physical attack using psychic energy.

The portrayed participants are:
Siddhartha, a Swedish harbor master, who says he feels like a king in his nice house, but also that he is lonely, and longs for a woman.
Peter, who has come with his two sons; his wife did not come along.
Mervi, an older, female former career counselor from Finland. She suffers from a lack of saliva, but some activities are so exciting that it is produced. In the psychic energy exercise, she is knocked over, and the instructor claims that she failed to defend herself with the energy.
Ljus, an American hippie, and a former goatherd.
Regina Lund, a well-known singer/songwriter; she arrives one day later, because she had to sing at a wedding, and leaves earlier.
Marit, a shy Norwegian woman. On one occasion she reveals her hidden fantasy of being a queen; at her request the others one by one bow to her.
Nick, an Australian rugby coach who explains that he expected a different kind of festival; a female journalist friend suggested he attend while she would be there writing a story about the festival. He is very skeptical at first, describing the festival as a cult, but evolves into an enthusiastic participant. He teaches the group some Australian expressions, pronounced in the Australian way, such as "no worries".

Production
Three Miles North of Molkom is a low-budget film. Permission to film at the festival came only four weeks in advance. The crew consisted of the two directors and two camera men. Use is made of a Fig Rig. While other groups at the festival are formed at random, this group consisted of people willing and accepted to be in the film. Six of the seven participants were selected during the first six hours of the festival. Nick initially did not care whether he was filmed or not, he just wanted to hang out with the crew because to him they were the closest thing to normality around him. Regina Lund, who had announced that she was interested, was accepted after her arrival on the second day. 150 hours of film was shot. There was no time to watch the rushes during the festival.

References

External links

Info on the film production from the Dutch distributor (mostly in English)

2008 films
British documentary films
2008 documentary films
2000s English-language films
2000s British films